Kīlauea is an unincorporated community and census-designated place (CDP) in Kauai County, Hawaii, United States. As of the 2020 census it had a population of 3,014.

Kīlauea shares the name of the active volcano Kīlauea on the island of Hawaii. The name translates to "spewing" or "much spreading" in the Hawaiian language.

Geography

Kīlauea is on the northeastern shore of Kauai and is bordered to the west by Kalihiwai and to the north by the Pacific Ocean. Hawaii Route 56 passes through the south side of the community, leading west  to Hanalei and east  to the Moloaa area which includes Moloaa Forest Reserve and overlooks Moloaa Bay.

Demographics

References

Census-designated places in Kauai County, Hawaii